Liga Deportiva Universitaria de Quito's 1991 season was the club's 61st year of existence, the 38th year in professional football, and the 31st in the top level of professional football in Ecuador.

Kits
Sponsor(s): Philips

Squad

Competitions

Serie A

First stage

Results

Second stage

Group 1

Results

Third stage

Group 2

Note: Includes Bonus Points earned from the previous rounds: El Nacional (1.5); Emelec & LDU QUito (0.5)

Results

Copa Libertadores

First stage

Round of 16

References
RSSSF - 1991 Serie A 
RSSSF - 1991 Copa Libertadores

External links
Official Site 
LDU Quito (5) - Emelec (0)

1991